Elvin Mursaliyev (born 17 August 1988 in Baku) is an Azerbaijani Greco-Roman wrestler who won the silver medal at the 2010 European Wrestling Championships, also he won bronze medal at the 2014 European Wrestling Championships.

References

External links
 

Living people
1988 births
Azerbaijani male sport wrestlers
Sportspeople from Baku
European Games gold medalists for Azerbaijan
European Games medalists in wrestling
Wrestlers at the 2015 European Games
World Wrestling Championships medalists
Wrestlers at the 2016 Summer Olympics
Olympic wrestlers of Azerbaijan
European Wrestling Championships medalists
Islamic Solidarity Games medalists in wrestling
Islamic Solidarity Games competitors for Azerbaijan
20th-century Azerbaijani people
21st-century Azerbaijani people